Daniel Lipman is a writer and producer from Baltimore, Maryland. His best-known work to date is writing for and producing the hit American television shows Queer as Folk and Sisters. He is a partner with Ron Cowen in the television production company Cowlip Productions.

Filmography

Writer

 Queer as Folk (2000–2005)
 Sisters (1991)
 The Love She Sought (1990) (aka A Green Journey)
 An Early Frost (1985) 
 Family (1976/III)

Producer
 Queer as Folk (2000–2005)
 Sisters (1991)
 The Love She Sought (1990)
 An Early Frost (1985)

References

External links 

American male screenwriters
American television producers
Writers from Baltimore
Businesspeople from Baltimore
Living people
Place of birth missing (living people)
Primetime Emmy Award winners
Screenwriters from Maryland
1950 births